"People Are Strange" is a song by the American rock band the Doors. It appears on the band's second studio album, Strange Days, released in September 1967. It was also issued the same month as a single, which peaked at number 12 on the Billboard Hot 100 chart and in the top ten on the Cash Box charts. The song was written by Jim Morrison and Robby Krieger, although credit was given to each of the Doors. The single was released with "Unhappy Girl" as the B-side.

Writing
The song's composition started in early 1967. According to Doors drummer John Densmore, he and Doors guitarist Robby Krieger, who had then been roommates, were visited by Jim Morrison who appeared to be "deeply depressed." At Krieger's description, they later took a walk along Laurel Canyon in the Hollywood Hills area of Los Angeles. Morrison returned from the walk "euphoric" with the early lyrics of "People Are Strange". Intrigued by the new lyrics, Krieger was convinced that the song was a hit upon hearing the vocal melody:

Overview
In a review for AllMusic, critic Tom Maginnis wrote the song "reflects the group's fascination with the theatrical music of European cabaret." The song is about alienation and being an outsider, and Morrison may have addressed the song both to the hippie culture, to outsiders in general or to users of drugs such as LSD, or both. Similarly, author Melissa Ursula Dawn Goldsmith felt that "People Are Strange" uses the "Expressionist idea of alienation and distanciation", and that the lyrics purposely express something positive as strange. Densmore believes that the song was the manifestation of Morrison's "vulnerability".

Billboard described the single as an "easy rocker with compelling lyric."  Cash Box called it a  "smashing performance," saying that the "mid-speed setting... adds kick to the black humor of the lyrical content" and that the "production and work are fantastic."

Personnel
The Doors
John Densmore – drums
Robby Krieger – electric guitar
Ray Manzarek – organ
Jim Morrison – vocals

Additional musician
Doug Lubahn – bass guitar

Charts

Certifications

Echo & the Bunnymen cover

British group Echo & the Bunnymen recorded a cover version of "People Are Strange" for the soundtrack of the 1987 film The Lost Boys. It was subsequently released as a single in 1987 reaching number 29 on the UK Singles Chart in February 1988 and number 13 on the Irish Singles Chart in 1991. 

The song was produced by Doors' keyboardist, Ray Manzarek. A 12-inch version was released in February 1988 before the single was re-released in 1991. The B-sides were all the same as their previous release, "Bedbugs and Ballyhoo".

Chart positions

Stina Nordenstam cover

Swedish singer-songwriter Stina Nordenstam covered "People Are Strange" on her 1998 cover album of the same name. A remix single was released in conjunction with the album. The UNKLE remix appears as a bonus track on the Japanese version of the album, and can also be found on UNKLE's box set, Eden.

References

1967 singles
1967 songs
1987 singles
1988 singles
1991 singles
The Doors songs
Echo & the Bunnymen songs
RPM Top Singles number-one singles
Songs about loneliness
Songs written by Robby Krieger
Songs written by Jim Morrison
Songs written for films
Song recordings produced by Paul A. Rothchild
Reprise Records singles
Elektra Records singles
Warner Music Group singles
East West Records singles